Space Base Delta 1 (SBD 1) is a United States Space Force garrison command. It is assigned to Space Operations Command and headquartered at Peterson Space Force Base, Colorado. The Peterson-Schriever Garrison is responsible for Peterson Space Force Base, Schriever Space Force Base, and Cheyenne Mountain Space Force Station in Colorado, Thule Air Base in Greenland, New Boston Space Force Station in New Hampshire, and Kaena Point Space Force Station in Hawaii. The Peterson-Schriever Garrison was activated on 24 July 2020, replacing the 21st Space Wing and the 50th Space Wing.

SBD 1 was formerly known as the Peterson-Schriever Garrison (P-S GAR) until its redesignation to Space Base Delta 1 on May 23, 2022.

Structure 
21st Mission Support (21 MS), Peterson Space Force Base
 21st Civil Engineer Squadron (21 CES)
 21st Communications Squadron (21 CS)
 21st Contracting Squadron (21 CONS)
 21st Force Support Squadron (21 FSS)
 21st Logistics Readiness Squadron (21 LRS)
 21st Security Forces Squadron (21 SFS)

 50th Mission Support (50 MS), Schriever Space Force Base
 50th Civil Engineer Squadron (50 CES)
 50th Contracting Squadron (50 CONS)
 50th Force Support Squadron (50 FSS)
 50th Security Forces Squadron (50 SFS)
 50th Logistics Readiness Flight (50 LRF)

 21st Medical Group (21 MDG), Peterson Space Force Base
 21st Dental Squadron (21 DS)
 21st Healthcare Operations Squadron (21 HCOS)
 21st Operational Medical Readiness Squadron (21 OMRS)
 21st Medical Squadron (21 MDS), Schriever SFB

821st Air Base Group (821 ABG), Thule Air Base
 821st Support Squadron (821 SPTS)
 821st Security Forces Squadron (821 SFS)

List of commanders

References 

Deltas of the United States Space Force